Meles may refer to:
 Meles (genus), a genus of badgers
 Meles of Lydia, a king of Lydia
 Meles Zenawi, prime minister of Ethiopia
 River Meles, which flowed through ancient Smyrna
 Meles, a minor character from Pausanias' Description of Greece.